Master Rhee is the abbreviated name of several taekwondo masters, as 이 (Lee/Rhee/Yi) is a common Korean family name. The three most widely known bearers of the name are probably:

 Chong Chul Rhee, known as the Father of Australian Taekwondo
 Jhoon Goo Rhee (1932–2018), known as the Father of American Taekwondo
 Ki Ha Rhee (born 1938), known as the Father of British Taekwondo